Yael Tal (born 26 May 1983 in Tel Aviv) is an Israeli actress, whose work spans film, theater, television and voice acting for animated shows. She is a graduate of Thelma Yellin High School for the Arts and the Yoram Leowinstein performing arts Studio.

Life and career 
Yael Tal grew up in Tel Aviv. From 1997 2001 she studied acting at the Thelma Yellin High School for the Arts. In 2007 she graduated from the Yoram Leowinstein performing arts Studio.

Theatre 
In March 2012 Tal could be seen in the theatre play The School for Wifes (בית ספר לנשים). Furthermore she played Bambi in The new criminals (הפושעים החדשיםהפושעים החדשים).

Television roles 
 The Golden Girls (Israeli version)
 Split
 Operation Porcupine
 Room Service
 Bekrov Etzlech
 Virgin Susie and the Holy Sisters from Petah-Tikva

Movies 
 Fill the Void (2012)

Theater 
 Love Story – Beit Lesin Theater
 A member of the comedy ensemble "Hagdud Ha’ivri" – The Tzavta Theater
 School For Wives (as Aniges) – The Cameri Theater

Personal life 
Yael Tal lives with Israeli musician Ido Ofek (Zigo), formerly a member of popular rock groups Dorbanim and Devek, and the two have collaborated on stage as part of the Hagdud Ha'ivri comedy ensemble.

External links
 
 Tal in Ishim site
 Tal in EDB site
 Hagdud Haivri ensemble in YouTube

References 

1983 births
Living people
Israeli film actresses
Israeli television actresses
Israeli stage actresses
Actresses from Tel Aviv